Rath Yatra is a Hindu festival. In Ahmedabad Rath Yatra has been organized by Jagannath Temple, Ahmedabad on every Asadh-Sud-Bij since 1878. This annual festival celebrates Jagannath, Balrama and Subhdra.

It is celebrated as a Lokotsav (public festival) of the state of Gujarat. The Ahmedabad Rath Yatra is the third largest Rath Yatra festival after those in Puri and Kolkata that are celebrated on the same day.

Legend 
Jagannath came in the dream of Narsimhadas and after that incident, he started to celebrate Rath Yatra in 1878.

Traditions 
The Raths (chariots) were made from coconut tree by the devotees of Khalas caste from Bharuch. Chariots are still driven by people from that caste.

Jalayatra
Jalayatra have been carried out on Jayestha Shukla Purnima when Jagannath, Balrama and Subhdra symbolically go to the maternal uncle's home at SaraspurDarshana in temple closed that day. Jalayatra of Jagannath to Sabarmati river come with a procession and perform the Ganga Poojan, returning with vessels of water for the Abhisheka to Jagannath. After performing the Shodashopchar Poojan Vidhi by chanting the vedic mantras, symbolically the Lord is sent to His maternal uncle’s home.

Netrotsav
Before two days prior to Rath Yatra, Netrotsav ritual on idols of is conducted. According to belief, the eyes of the three deities are affected with conjunctivitis, owing to eating of Jambu or Jamun (Indian blackberry) and Baur (plum) in excess at Mosal. Hence, idols are symbolically treated for it during Netrotsav pujan by covering eyes with clothes.

Rath Yatra 
Mangla Aarti is performed on the day at 4 am and usually Rath Yatra is carried out at 7 am. Pahind Vidhi ritual is performed by Chief Minister of Gujarat in which symbolic cleaning of the path of Rath Yatra is carried out, after which the chariot procession begins. In Rath Yatra, Lord Jagannath's chariot is carried out first, followed by Subhadra and Balram's chariot. Akharas, elephants, decorated trucks and troupes also take part in 14 kilometer long Rath Yatra.

References 

Culture of Ahmedabad
Hindu festivals in India
Festivals in Jagannath
Events in Ahmedabad